The Roman Catholic Diocese of Juneau (Latin: Dioecesis Junellensis) was an ecclesiastical territory or diocese of the Roman Catholic Church in the northwestern United States, comprising the southeastern part of the state of Alaska. It was led by a prelate bishop who served as pastor of the mother church, Cathedral of the Nativity of the Blessed Virgin Mary in Juneau. The diocese of Juneau was a suffragan diocese of the Archdiocese of Anchorage.

On May 19, 2020, the Diocese of Juneau was merged with the Archdiocese of Anchorage, which was renamed the Archdiocese of Anchorage-Juneau, and Bishop Andrew Bellisario was elevated to Archbishop.

History
The See of Juneau was erected on June 23, 1951, and took its territory from the former Apostolic Vicariate of Alaska. On October 3, 1951, Father Dermot O'Flanagan of Holy Family Church in Anchorage was installed as the first Bishop of Juneau and he served until 1968. While in office, Bishop O'Flanagan attended the Second Vatican Council.

In 2007, the Juneau diocese became vacant when the previous bishop, Most Reverend Michael W. Warfel, was appointed bishop of Great Falls–Billings.

On January 19, 2009, Pope Benedict XVI named Edward J. Burns, a priest of the Diocese of Pittsburgh, as Bishop of Juneau. He was installed on April 5, 2009. In December 2016, Pope Francis named Burns Bishop of Dallas.

Pope Francis appointed Andrew E. Bellisario, CM bishop on July 11, 2017.  He later became, concurrently, apostolic administrator of the Anchorage archdiocese.  In 2020, these 2 jurisdictions were combined to form the Archdiocese of Anchorage-Juneau, and he was appointed its Archbishop.

Bishops
The list of bishops and their years of service:
 Robert Dermot O'Flanagan (1951-1968)
 Francis Thomas Hurley (1971-1976), appointed Archbishop of Anchorage
 Michael Hughes Kenny (1979-1995)
 Michael William Warfel (1996-2007), appointed Bishop of Great Falls-Billings
 Edward James Burns (2009-2017), appointed Bishop of Dallas
 Andrew Eugene Bellisario, CM (2017–2020), appointed Archbishop of Anchorage-Juneau

Priests
As of 2019:
 Rev. Patrick Travers (vicar general)
 Rev. Pat Casey, OMI
 Rev. Mike Galbraith
 Rev. Steve Gallagher
 Rev. Perry Kenaston
 Rev. Edmund J. Penisten
 Rev. Andrew Sensenig, OMI

Parishes, missions and shrines

 Holy Family, Gustavus (Mission)
 Sacred Heart, Haines
 Sacred Heart, Hoonah 
 Cathedral of the Nativity of the Blessed Virgin Mary, Juneau
 St. Paul the Apostle, Juneau
 National Shrine of St. Thérèse, Juneau
 Catholic Community, Kake (Mission)
 Holy Name, Ketchikan
 St. John by the Sea, Klawock (Prince of Wales Island)
 Holy Family, Metlakatla (Mission)
 Body of Christ, Pelican (Mission)
 St. Catherine of Siena, Petersburg
 St. Gregory of Nazianzen, Sitka
 St. Therese of the Child Jesus, Skagway
 St. Francis Chapel, Tenakee Springs (Mission)
 St. Rose of Lima, Wrangell
 St. Ann, Yakutat

Popular culture
In the television series The Young Pope, directed by Paolo Sorrentino, the fictional Pope Pius XIII repeatedly assigned his enemies in the Curia to "Ketchikan, Alaska", to suffer its freezing weather and isolation. There is no such diocese, but it is a parish of the Diocese of Juneau.

See also
 Catholic Church by country
 Catholic Church hierarchy
 Ecclesiastical Province of Anchorage
 Historical list of the Catholic bishops of the United States
 List of Roman Catholic archdioceses (by country and continent)
 List of Roman Catholic dioceses (alphabetical) (including archdioceses)
 List of Roman Catholic dioceses (structured view) (including archdioceses)

References

External links
 Roman Catholic Diocese of Juneau Official Site
 Official site of the Holy See

 
Juneau
Christian organizations established in 1951
Juneau
Former Roman Catholic dioceses in America
Religious organizations disestablished in 2020
1951 establishments in Alaska